The Cornell University School of Nursing was a nursing school in New York City founded in 1877 as the New York Hospital Training School for Nurses; it closed in 1979. The school awarded a Bachelor of Nursing degree after five years of study, two in an undergraduate college and three at the Medical Center. It was one of the few institutions that offered an undergraduate nursing program geared especially for those who already had a bachelor's degree in another field.

As a part of New York Hospital, the school began its connection with Cornell University when Cornell's Medical College affiliated with New York Hospital in 1927. In 1932, the school moved to the joint campus on the upper east side of New York when both institutions co-located. The school became a unit of Cornell University in 1942 and was renamed as the Cornell University-New York Hospital School of Nursing.

The school remained financially independent of the University, however, with Cornell providing only the salary of the dean. The rest of its funding came from state and federal sources, tuition, and the daily charges billed to patients staying at New York Hospital. In the mid-1970s insurance companies started to refuse to reimburse nursing education expenses as a part of hospital charges, and federal funding also declined. A 1970 university planning review had furthermore concluded that there were enough undergraduate nursing programs available through CUNY and SUNY to serve the city. Consequently, the university closed down the school, and the last class graduated in 1979.

A history of the school from 1877-1979 is found in Go, and Do Thou Likewise by Shirley H. Fondiller.  The historical records of the School of Nursing are housed at the Medical Center Archives of NewYork-Presbyterian/Weill Cornell

Notable alumni
 Lillian Wald, founder of the Visiting Nurse Service
 Annie Warburton Goodrich, first dean of the U.S. Army School of Nursing and of the Yale School of Nursing
 Julia Catherine Stimson, chief nurse of the Red Cross Nursing Service in France during World War I
 Irene Sutliffe, noted nursing education administrator

References

External link
 New York Hospital-Cornell University School of Nursing Alumni Association

Educational institutions established in 1877
Educational institutions disestablished in 1979
Nursing
Nursing schools in New York City
Universities and colleges in New York City